ZPM may refer to:

 Mixtepec Zapotec (ISO 639-3 code: zpm), an Oto-Manguean language of Oaxaca, Mexico
 Zero-propellant maneuver, an optimal attitude trajectory used to perform spacecraft rotational control without the need to use thrusters
 Zero Point Module, a fictional device in the Stargate universe
 Zyvex Technologies (previously Zyvex Performance Materials), a molecular engineering company headquartered in Columbus, Ohio